may refer to:
A region name that mostly corresponds to the combined areas of Chichibu City and Chichibu District in Saitama, Japan:
Chichibu, Saitama, a city
Chichibu District, Saitama
Prince Chichibu, a member of the Japanese imperial family
Chichibunomiya Rugby Stadium, a stadium in Tokyo named after Prince Chichibu